Akhmed Aligadzhiyevich Khaybullayev (born 29 March 1985) is a former Russian professional football player.

Club career
He made his debut for the senior squad of FC Anzhi Makhachkala on 13 June 2007 in the Russian Cup game against FC Rotor Volgograd.

External links
 

1985 births
People from Izberbash
Living people
Russian footballers
Association football goalkeepers
FC Anzhi Makhachkala players
FC Baltika Kaliningrad players
FC Sheksna Cherepovets players
Sportspeople from Dagestan